"Bitch Lasagna" (originally named "T-Series Diss Track" and stylized in all lowercase) is a song by Swedish YouTuber and comedian PewDiePie in collaboration with Dutch music producer Party In Backyard. The song satirizes Indian music label T-Series, as a response to predictions that T-Series would surpass PewDiePie in terms of subscriber count. The song was one of the first events in the PewDiePie vs T-Series competition, in which the two channels competed for the title of the most-subscribed YouTube channel.

The song was first released with an accompanying music video on 5 October 2018, and was renamed and re-released to music platforms on 6 November 2018. , the song has accumulated over 311 million views on YouTube, making it the most-viewed video on PewDiePie's YouTube channel.

Background

PewDiePie vs T-Series

In mid-to-late 2018, the subscriber count of the Indian music label T-Series rapidly approached that of Swedish YouTuber and web comedian PewDiePie, who at the time was the most-subscribed user on YouTube. As a result, fans, along with celebrities and other YouTubers, showed their support for each channel by encouraging others to subscribe. During the competition, both channels gained a significant number of subscribers at a rapid rate, jumping from approximately 60 million to 100 million subscribers within a few months. The two channels surpassed each other in subscriber count on a number of occasions in February, March, and then in April 2019, when PewDiePie declared an end to the "subscribe to PewDiePie" meme and T-Series became the most-subscribed YouTube channel.

Song content
The title of the song references a viral Facebook Messenger screenshot, popularized on Reddit, in which an Indian man, in broken English, demands nude photos, and, when his messages go unanswered, he posts bitch lasagna (lasagna might have been an approximation to the parting phrase hasta lasagna, but without punctuation the post looked like he was calling her a bitch lasagna). In the song, PewDiePie insults T-Series and their video content, makes references to contemporary Indian stereotypes and accuses the company of using subscriber bots to gain fake subscriptions. The Indian background of T-Series was also mocked, such as in the line "Your language sounds like it come [sic] from a mumble rap community", which have been described as racist by some media publications, as well as in a court ruling from the High Court of Delhi that sided with T-Series.

Reception

Controversy
As PewDiePie vs T-Series coverage grew in the mainstream media, news organizations covered "Bitch Lasagna" for its role in the feud. Vox accused the lyrics of containing "overt and implied racism," which they said pervaded PewDiePie's fans' support for his channel against T-Series. Rolling Stone reported that PewDiePie was accused of using anti-Indian slurs in the song. They continued, "many have argued ... that his use of "ironic" antisemitic or racist humor in his videos may serve as a gateway for subscribers to start seeking out more overtly extremist content," though this was disputed by Evan Balgord, executive director of the Canadian Anti-Hate Network, who they quoted as saying, "PewDiePie rarely if ever flags my radar. I don't follow him closely as a result... he's nowhere nearly as cited as a stepping stone to radicalization as an individual like [alt-right YouTuber and podcaster] Stefan Molyneux, for example."

Ban in India
On 10 April 2019, the song was banned in India as a result of PewDiePie releasing a second diss track against T-Series, "Congratulations". T-Series asserted the tracks were "defamatory, disparaging, insulting, and offensive" and that the songs contained "repeated comments... abusive, vulgar, and also racist in nature." The Delhi High Court granted the injunction against the two songs, noting that, in communication with T-Series after the release of "Bitch Lasagna", PewDiePie had apologized for posting the video and had "assured that he [was] not planning any more videos on the same line."

In August 2019, it was reported that T-Series and PewDiePie had settled their legal disputes outside of court.

Response 
Response ranged from many Indian youtubers and CarryMinati , an Indian youtuber launched his disstrack , "Bye PewDiePie" in which he badly criticized PewDiePie , the disstrack has 62M+ views on YouTube yet.

Charts

Cover versions and remixes
 Party In Backyard, on a single release(19 October 2018)
 PelleK, a metal cover in a single release(24 October 2018)
 Dylan Locke, a remix as a single release(11 December 2018)
 Bic Lasagna, a parody song as a single release - GenneTube (16 March 2020)

Notes

See also
 PewDiePie videography
 List of diss tracks § YouTube
 List of viral music videos

References

2018 debut singles
2018 songs
2018 YouTube videos
Anti-Indian sentiment
Diss tracks
Internet memes introduced in 2018
Obscenity controversies in music
Online obscenity controversies
PewDiePie songs
Race-related controversies in music
Songs about India
T-Series (company)
Viral videos
YouTube controversies
Comedy rap songs
Trap music songs
Satirical songs